David Michael Gauke (born 8 October 1971) is a British political commentator, solicitor and former politician who was the Member of Parliament (MP) for South West Hertfordshire from 2005 to 2019. He served in the Cabinet under Theresa May, most notably as Secretary of State for Justice and Lord Chancellor from 2018 to 2019. First elected as a Conservative, Gauke had the Conservative whip removed on 3 September 2019 and until the dissolution sat as an independent politician.

Gauke served in the Cameron Government as Exchequer Secretary to the Treasury from 2010 to 2014 and Financial Secretary to the Treasury from 2014 to 2016. During the formation of the May Government in July 2016, he was appointed to the Cabinet as Chief Secretary to the Treasury, where he remained until being appointed Secretary of State for Work and Pensions in 2017. Gauke was appointed Secretary of State for Justice and Lord Chancellor in January 2018. He resigned on 24 July 2019 following the Conservative Party leadership election.

Early life and career
Gauke was educated at Northgate High School in Ipswich, Suffolk.  He read law at St Edmund Hall, Oxford and the College of Law in Chester, where he graduated in legal practice in 1995.

In 1993, he was a researcher for Barry Legg, the Conservative MP for Milton Keynes South West. He worked as a trainee solicitor with Richards Butler from 1995, being admitted as a solicitor in 1997.  From 1999 to 2005, he was a solicitor in the financial services group at Macfarlanes, a corporate law firm.

Gauke was elected as the vice-chairman of the Brent East Conservative Association for two years from 1998, and contested the seat at the 2001 general election finishing in second place 13,047 votes behind the Labour MP Paul Daisley.

Parliamentary career
Gauke was elected to the House of Commons at the 2005 general election for Hertfordshire South West following the retirement of Richard Page. Gauke won the seat with a majority of 8,473, making his maiden speech on 9 June 2005. Between 2005 and 2008, he served as a member of the Procedure Select committee. He was a member of the Treasury Select Committee between 2006 and 2007, before joining the Opposition front bench as Shadow Treasury Minister.

Following his re-election at the 2010 general election, he was appointed Exchequer Secretary to the Treasury.

In December 2013, Gauke was reported to HM Revenue and Customs after advertising an unpaid six-month "training post" at his constituency office in Rickmansworth, Hertfordshire.

After four years in the post of Exchequer Secretary to the Treasury, Gauke moved to become the Financial Secretary to the Treasury.

On 13 July 2016, Gauke was made a member of the Privy Council, giving him the style The Right Honourable.  The following day, he was appointed Chief Secretary to the Treasury following the appointment of Theresa May to Prime Minister of the United Kingdom.

On 11 June 2017, Gauke was appointed Secretary of State for Work and Pensions, leaving the Treasury after seven years.

On 8 January 2018, Gauke succeeded David Lidington as Secretary of State for Justice and Lord Chancellor. He is the first solicitor to have held the post.

On 8 June 2019, following Gauke's "refusal to enact the commitments made in the Conservative manifesto" and his supporting the leadership candidacy of Rory Stewart in favour of persisting with May's withdrawal agreement, his constituency association wrote to all members calling a special meeting for a vote of no-confidence.

On 20 July 2019, Gauke confirmed to The Sunday Times that he would resign as Secretary of State after Prime Minister's Questions on 24 July 2019, citing that he could not serve Boris Johnson as Prime Minister and run the risk of pursuing a no-deal exit from the European Union. Gauke and other similarly minded MPs became known in the media as the "Gaukeward Squad".

Expenses
Gauke claimed £10,248.32 in stamp duty and fees involved in the purchase of his second home in London, a flat. A Channel 4 Dispatches programme revealed that he was claiming expenses on the flat in central London despite having a property located only one hour away on public transport.

Gauke sold the flat in August 2012, keeping £27,000, the property price having increased by £67,000 since purchase. He paid nearly £40,000 of this to the Independent Parliamentary Standards Authority (IPSA) as MPs only have to pay back any profit made in the previous two years.

He told the British public that negotiating a price discount with tradesmen for paying in cash for the purposes of evading tax is morally wrong.

Sitting as an independent

On 3 September 2019, Gauke joined 20 other rebel Conservative MPs to vote against the Conservative government of Boris Johnson. The rebel MPs voted with the Opposition to seize control of parliamentary business from the government, allowing the subsequent passage of the Benn act. The government had declared that voting against the original motion would be viewed as a matter of confidence in the government, as voting in favour of the motion would effectively be "destroying the government's negotiating position and handing control of parliament to Jeremy Corbyn." After voting against the government on a "confidence-issue," all 21 were advised that they had lost the Conservative whip, expelling them as Conservative MPs and requiring them to sit as independents. If they decided to run for re-election in a future election, the party would block their selection as Conservative candidates.

Gauke stood in his constituency as an independent candidate, and came second with 26% of the vote, by far the best result of any of those former Conservative Members who sought re-election as independents. The Conservative candidate won the seat with 49.6% of the vote and a majority of 14,408 votes.

Post-Parliament
In May 2020, six months after leaving Parliament, it was announced that Gauke was re-joining Macfarlanes as their head of policy. He is also a political commentator and a columnist for the New Statesman where he writes about British and international politics from a liberal centrist perspective.

Personal life
Gauke is married to Rachel (née Rank), who is a professional support lawyer specialising in corporate tax at legal research provider LexisNexis. They have three sons and live in Chorleywood in Hertfordshire.

He is a lifelong supporter of Ipswich Town F.C.

References

External links

 Official website (Archived)
 
 

1971 births
Alumni of St Edmund Hall, Oxford
Conservative Party (UK) MPs for English constituencies
Independent members of the House of Commons of the United Kingdom
Living people
Members of the Privy Council of the United Kingdom
Politicians from Ipswich
People from Chorleywood
Politics of Dacorum
UK MPs 2005–2010
UK MPs 2010–2015
UK MPs 2015–2017
UK MPs 2017–2019
Lord chancellors of Great Britain
Secretaries of State for Justice (UK)
English solicitors
Chief Secretaries to the Treasury
Independent British political candidates